Mir Ghesmat Mosavi Asl (born 1961) is an Iranian Shiite cleric and politician.

Mosavi was born in Germi, Ardabil Province. He is a member of the 2000 and present Islamic Consultative Assembly from the electorate of Germi. Mosavi won with 18,004 (36.12%) votes.

References

People from Germi
Deputies of Germi
Living people
1961 births
Members of the 9th Islamic Consultative Assembly
Members of the 6th Islamic Consultative Assembly
Followers of Wilayat fraction members